Kumanayakage Ravindra Yasas (born 20 April 1964 රවීන්ද්‍ර යසස් [Sinhala]) is an actor in Sri Lankan cinema, theater and television as well as a singer and a radio host. Highly versatile actor mostly engaged in theater and television, he is currently serving as a Western Provincial Councilor.

Personal life
Yasas is married to theater director Kokilani Benaragama. The couple has one son, Kasun Chamara is also a renowned actor and singer, who started career with musical program Hapan Padura. Chamara acted with father in few films such as Jim Pappa and Pin Pon. Kokilani is the sister of popular actor Jagath Benaragama.

Career
In 1984, he started  his stage drama career with the popular play Abuddassa Kolama. Then he acted in the stage drama Raja Kapuru. His song Suwanda Saban Aga Gala in the play was highly popularized. He started cinema career with the 1995 film Ayoma directed by Parakrama Niriella. Then he acted in many comedy roles in films including Hai Baby Hai, Pissu Puso, Jim Pappa and Kosthapal Punyasoma. In 1999, he won Sumathi Merit Award for the role in Avul Haraya teledrama.

He has portrayed in many political satires on television such as And Company by singing ‘Virindu’, making a mockery of current social and political issues. He has released a music album titled Anda Manda Virindu.

Selected stage dramas

 Abuddassa Kolama
 Deyyoth Danne Ne
 Handa Nihanda
Hora Police
 Meeyo Nathuwa Be
 Raja Kapuru

Selected television serials

 Ada Sihinaya
 And Company
 Apuru Sahodaraya
 Avul Haraya
 Dala Rala Pela
 Damsaari
 Hatara Kenderaya
 Kota Uda Mandira
 Mehew Rate
 Pata Veeduru
 Samudra Chaya
 Sathara Ima Gini 
 Sidu
 Sikuru Wasanthe
 Visula Ahasa Yata
 Yaso Mandira

Political career
His first involvement in politics was around 1990s as a JVP activist  In 2014, he contested for Western Province in provincial council election under Democratic Party led by Sarath Fonseka from Kalutara District.
Currently he contest under Samagi Jana Balawegaya leb by Sajith Premadasa.

Accident
on 28 January 2019 Kumanayake admitted with minor injuries to the Horana Base Hospital for treatment after his car crashed into a tree at Gammanpila in Bandaragama on the Kesbewa Road. The accident happened at about 4:45 am while he was on his way home after attending for a radio program.

Filmography

References

External links
 "Trying to rescue wild cat ... crashed into tree" -- Ravindra Yasas
 What happened to Ravindra Yasas
 මගේ සේවය විනිවිදයි

Sri Lankan male film actors
Living people
Sinhalese male actors
1964 births
Sri Lankan actor-politicians